Yoo Se-hyung (born May 12, 1992) is a South Korean actor. He is best known for his main role in Tomorrow Boy and Reply Pyeongchang, 100 °F. He is also known for appearing in the famous film Another Promise.

Filmography

Television

Film

References

External links 
 
 

1992 births
Living people
21st-century South Korean male actors
South Korean male models
South Korean male television actors
South Korean male film actors
South Korean male singers
South Korean male web series actors
South Korean pop singers